Enteroxenos oestergreni is a species of minute sea snail, a marine gastropod mollusk in the family Eulimidae. The species is notable for being commonly misspelt as Enteroxenos ostergreni in previous documentations,. These misspellings have been corrected by Bonnevie shortly after the species was taxonomised.

Distribution
This marine species occurs in the following locations:

 European waters (ERMS scope)
 United Kingdom Exclusive Economic Zone

References

External links
 To World Register of Marine Species

Eulimidae
Gastropods described in 1902